Out of the Blues: The Best of David Bromberg is a compilation album by American multi-instrumentalist and singer-songwriter David Bromberg, released by Columbia Records in 1977.

Critical reception

On Allmusic, Stephen Thomas Erlewine said, "Out of the Blues: Best of David Bromberg is a solid ten-track collection that features many highlights from Bromberg's '70s recordings, including both originals... and covers.... It's a good summation of his prime period and, therefore, a good introduction to his music."

Billboard wrote, "A 'best' package with some live sets dating back as far as 1972. Traces the development and influences of Bromberg's style with a collage of blues, country, funky r&b, and jazz all punctuated by some fine guitar picking."

Track listing

Side one
 "The Holdup" (David Bromberg, George Harrison) – 3:02
 "Send Me to the 'Lectric Chair" [live] (George Brooks) – 4:52
 "The Joke's on Me" (Bromberg) – 3:31
 "Mr. Bojangles" [live] (Jerry Jeff Walker) – 7:25
 "The New Lee Highway Blues" (Bromberg) – 5:40

Side two
 "Suffer to Sing the Blues" (Bromberg) – 4:54
 "Kansas City" [live] (Jerry Leiber and Mike Stoller)– 3:57
 "Demon in Disguise" (Bromberg) – 5:05
 "(What a) Wonderful World" (Sam Cooke, Herb Alpert, Lou Adler)  – 3:23
 "Sharon" (Bromberg) – 6:05

Original albums
The songs on Out of the Blues: The Best of David Bromberg were excerpted from the following albums.
David Bromberg (1972) – "Suffer to Sing the Blues"
Demon in Disguise (1972) – "Mr. Bojangles", "Demon in Disguise", "Sharon"
Wanted Dead or Alive (1974) – "The Holdup", "Send Me to the 'Lectric Chair", "The New Lee Highway Blues", "Kansas City"
Midnight on the Water (1975) – "The Joke's on Me", "(What a) Wonderful World"

References

David Bromberg albums
1977 albums
Columbia Records albums